The Witchery by the Castle is a restaurant on the Royal Mile near Edinburgh Castle which also provides bed and breakfast accommodation.

The restaurant was opened in 1979 by chef James Thompson.  At the start there were just three staff but the business has now grown to employ over 70, including several housekeepers, a night porter and 16 chefs.

The building is Boswell's Court which was built in 1595 for merchant Thomas Lowthian and subsequently named after John Boswell – an eccentric physician who lived there and entertained his nephew James Boswell and Dr Johnson.  The building was later used as an office and rectory for the Church of Scotland.  It is said to be haunted by one of the thousand people who were burned for witchcraft on Castlehill in 15th and 16th centuries.  The eight bedroom suites are furnished in a Gothic style with oak panelling, tapestries and antique features.

Notable people who have stayed there include Andrew Lloyd Webber and Catherine Zeta-Jones.

See also
 Prestonfield House
 List of restaurants in Scotland
 Jesse Dunford Wood, a notable chef trained at The Witchery by the Castle

References

External links
 Official website

Restaurants in Edinburgh
Reportedly haunted locations in Edinburgh